Pauline Delabroy-Allard (born 1988) is a French writer. Her first novel, All About Sarah, was published by Penguin Books in 2018. Delabroy-Allard received numerous awards for her novel, .

In an interview with The Guardian, Delabroy-Allard revealed: "She wrote it to get the story out of her head and then stuck it in a drawer." And said: “I didn’t expect anyone would want to publish it.”

References 

1988 births
French novelists
Living people